Guillermo Pellegrini (born 25 November 1945) is an Argentine equestrian. He competed in the individual dressage event at the 1976 Summer Olympics.

References

1945 births
Living people
Argentine male equestrians
Argentine dressage riders
Olympic equestrians of Argentina
Equestrians at the 1976 Summer Olympics
Place of birth missing (living people)